Irshadali Mohamed Sumra (born 9 December 1962) is a Kenyan businessman and politician who was elected as a member of the Kenyan Parliament in the 2013 parliamentary elections.

References

External links

1962 births
Living people
Kenyan businesspeople
Orange Democratic Movement politicians
Members of the 11th Parliament of Kenya
Kenyan politicians of Indian descent